Davide Orrico (born 17 February 1990) is an Italian cyclist, who last rode for UCI ProTeam .

Major results

2007
 9th Trofeo comune di Vertova
2012
 6th Gran Premio di Poggiana
2013
 5th Piccolo Giro di Lombardia
 5th Gran Premio San Giuseppe
 6th Overall Giro del Friuli-Venezia Giulia
2014
 9th Overall Giro del Friuli-Venezia Giulia
2016
 5th Giro del Medio Brenta
 8th Overall Circuit des Ardennes
 9th Trofeo Edil C
2017
 3rd Gran Premio di Lugano
 4th Overall Tour of Albania
 10th GP Adria Mobil
2018
 1st  Mountains classification Tour de Savoie Mont-Blanc
 6th Coppa Ugo Agostoni
 9th Overall Oberösterreich Rundfahrt
2021
 8th Gran Premio di Lugano
 10th Giro del Veneto

References

External links

1990 births
Living people
Sportspeople from Como
Italian male cyclists
Cyclists from the Province of Como
21st-century Italian people